Alon Ḥilu (born Jaffa, Israel, June 21, 1972) is an Israeli novelist.

His first novel, Death of a Monk (Xargol, 2004), is based on a historical blood libel against the Jews in Damascus, Syria, and offers an original homosexual interpretation for the historical events. The novel was shortlisted for the prestigious Sapir Prize in Israel (2005), was awarded the Presidential Prize for literature (Israel, 2006) and has been translated into English (Harvill Secker, London), French (Edition Du Seuil, Paris), Greek (Metaichmio, Athens) and Dutch (Ambo Anthos, Amsterdam).

Hilu's second novel, The House of Rajani (Harvill Secker, Random House UK), a fictional retelling of the history of early Zionism, was published in Hebrew in February 2008 by Yedioth Sfarim. The novel initially received the 2009 Sapir Prize, but after claims were made regarding a conflict of interests among the judges (Yossi Sarid, the head judge of the committee, was related to the novel's editor) the prize was withdrawn and the award cancelled. Israel's president Shimon Peres called it "an extraordinary book".

His recent book, Murder in the Red House, is a historical novel about the mysterious murder of the renowned writer Yosef Haim Brenner and five of his friends, in a mansion among the orchards of Jaffa in 1921. The novel was published in Hebrew in May 2018 by Yedioth Sfarim. 

Hilu earned a degree in dramatic writing at Tel Aviv University, studying under Israel's leading playwrights, such as Yehoshua Sobol and Shmuel Hasfari. His plays, "The Wedding" and "The Day of the Dogs", were produced in theatre festivals in Israel, and were both translated into English for the Harvard Radcliffe Dramatic Club. From 1987 to 1988, Hilu wrote radio plays for Israeli Radio. During the 90s, two of his short stories were published in Israeli literary magazines: "The Biblical Zoo in Jerusalem" (Iton 77, 1992) and "Last Seen" (Moznaim, 1993). In addition to his writing career, Hilu holds a law degree and practices intellectual property law as an attorney.

External links

Alon Hilu at Xargol.com
Alon Hilu at Random House website

Israeli novelists
1972 births
Living people
People from Jaffa
Recipients of Prime Minister's Prize for Hebrew Literary Works
Tel Aviv University alumni
 Israeli lawyers